Brett David Wade (born June 24, 1993) is a former professional Canadian football defensive lineman. He played U Sports football for the Calgary Dinos and played in the CJFL for the Regina Thunder.

Professional career
Wade was drafted by the Hamilton Tiger-Cats in the second round, 15th overall, in the 2018 CFL Draft and signed with the team on May 20, 2018. He played in his first professional game on August 10, 2018 against the Winnipeg Blue Bombers. He recorded both his first defensive tackle and first quarterback sack against the BC Lions on September 29, 2018. He finished the 2018 season with one tackle and one sack in five games played.

Wade re-signed with the Tiger-Cats on January 22, 2021. He retired from football on June 29, 2021.

References

External links
Hamilton Tiger-Cats bio

Living people
1993 births
Canadian football defensive linemen
Canadian Junior Football League players
Calgary Dinos football players
Players of Canadian football from Saskatchewan
Sportspeople from Regina, Saskatchewan
Hamilton Tiger-Cats players